The Office of the Chief Commissioner for Persons with Disabilities is a Government of India agency under the Ministry of Social Justice and Empowerment.

This has been set up under the Persons with Disabilities (Equal Opportunities, Protection of Rights & Full Participation) (PWD) Act, 1995 It is mandated to take steps to safeguard the rights of persons with disabilities. The Chief Commissioner is vested with the power of a civil court under the Code of Civil Procedure. There are separate Commissioners for State and Union Territories.

Kamlesh Kumar Pandey is the current Chief Commissioner. Shri Prasanna Kumar Pincha was the first person with disability holding this post.

The Chief Commissioner has criticised the state government of Bihar for delays in implementing a State Commission.

References

External links

Disability in India
Government agencies of India
Ministry of Social Justice and Empowerment